Chinkwell Tor is a granite tor on Dartmoor, England. It consists of two cairns at the summit which stand at 458 metres above sea level  It is surrounded by other tors and features such as:
Widecombe-in-the-Moor village
Bell Tor
Honeybag Tor
Hameldown Tor
Great Houndtor 
Bonehill Rocks
Haytor and Lowman
Saddle Tor
Rippon Tor

References

Dartmoor
Tors of Dartmoor